Catherine Gillian Pickles is a New Zealand history academic, and as of 2019 is a full professor at the University of Canterbury.

Academic career
After an undergraduate at the University of Canterbury (where she edited the student paper Canta) and University of British Columbia, Pickles completed a 1996 PhD titled  'Representing twentieth century Canadian colonial identity : the Imperial Order Daughters of the Empire (IODE)'  at McGill University. Pickles returned to the University of Canterbury, rising to full professor.

Much of Pickles' work is influenced by postcolonial and feminist approaches.

Selected works 
 Pickles, Katie. "Female imperialism and national identity." (2018).
 Pickles, Katie. Transnational outrage: The death and commemoration of Edith Cavell. Springer, 2016.
 Rutherdale, Myra, and Katie Pickles, eds. Contact zones: Aboriginal and settler women in Canada's colonial past. UBC Press, 2014.
 Pickles, Katie. "A link in ‘the great chain of Empire friendship’: the Victoria League in New Zealand." The Journal of Imperial and Commonwealth History 33, no. 1 (2005): 29-50.
 Pickles, Katie. "Colonial counterparts: the first academic women in Anglo-Canada, New Zealand and Australia." Women's History Review 10, no. 2 (2001): 273–298.
 Pickles, Katie. "Kiwi Icons and the Re‐Settlement of New Zealand 1 as Colonial Space." New Zealand Geographer 58, no. 2 (2002): 5–16.

References

External links
 

Living people
New Zealand women historians
Year of birth missing (living people)
21st-century New Zealand historians
University of Canterbury alumni
Academic staff of the University of Canterbury
Feminist historians
21st-century New Zealand women writers
New Zealand feminists